Stanley Zajdel (April 17, 1927 – September 22, 2017) was an American football player and coach.

Playing career
Zajdel played college football at St. Bonaventure University in Allegany, New York during the 1949 and 1950 seasons. He is listed as a member of the Pittsburgh Steelers in 1951.

University of Dayton
Zajdel  served as the head football coach at the University of Dayton from 1960 to 1962. He previously served as an assistant at Dayton from 1955 to 1959, during which time he coached future Notre Dame coach Gerry Faust.

Death
Zajdel died in 2017 at the age of 90.

Head coaching record

College

References

1927 births
2017 deaths
American football halfbacks
Dayton Flyers football coaches
LIU Post Pioneers football coaches
Merchant Marine Mariners football coaches
Pittsburgh Panthers football coaches
Pittsburgh Steelers players
St. Bonaventure Brown Indians football players
High school football coaches in New York (state)
People from Braddock, Pennsylvania
Players of American football from Pennsylvania